The Izaro was a Spanish automobile manufactured around 1922.  A cyclecar with models ranging from 600 cc to 700 cc, it was a product of Madrid.

References
David Burgess Wise, The New Illustrated Encyclopedia of Automobiles.

Cyclecars
Defunct motor vehicle manufacturers of Spain
Economy of Madrid